The list of ship commissionings in 2002 includes a chronological list of all ships commissioned in 2002.


See also 

2002
 Ship commissionings